Jal Pari is a 2011 Pakistani television drama series aired on the Geo Entertainment, directed by Sarmad Sultan Khoosat and written by Sarmad Sehbai. Serial was first aired on 13 October 2011 and last aired on 2 February 2012 and features Neelam Muneer, Adnan Siddiqui, Noman Ijaz and Mikaal Zulfiqar.

Retitled as Deewana Kise Banayegi Yeh Ladki, it also broadcast in India on Zindagi.

Cast 
 Neelam Muneer as Shaista
 Adnan Siddiqui as Rashid
 Noman Ijaz
 Mikaal Zulfiqar
 Hina Khawaja Bayat
 Saife Hassan As Shaista's Principal
 Adnan Shah Tipu
 Mahjabeen Habib
 Hafeez Mama
 Shamim Hilaly
 Uzmi
 Gohar Rasheed
 Rashid Farooqi
 Raza Zaidi
 Zulfiqar Ikhlaqi
 Rabiya Kazi
 Sabir shah Camkani

Soundtrack 
Jal Pari original song title is sung by Rahat Fateh Ali Khan and composers are Farukh Abid and Shoaib Farukh.

References

External links 
 
 

2011 Pakistani television series debuts
Pakistani drama television series
Geo TV original programming
Urdu-language television shows
Romantic fantasy television series
2012 Pakistani television series endings